Emmanuel Kwadwo Oware, better known by his stage name Ayisi ( formerly A.I)  is a Ghanaian Afro Pop, Hip Hop and Hip-Life artiste.

Life and music career 
Ayisi pronounced 'ayisi' was born in Accra, capital of Ghana begun recording in his High school days at Presbyterian Boys Secondary School in 2004. Before that his nursery days were at Ave Maria and then later on to Presec Staff Primary and then to St Andrews. Ayisi discovered his love for music at an early age through his father who was a drummer in a band and had a vast number of collections he would delve into. He liked to write a lot and would use the habit to polish his lyrical skills. Ayisi is a sibling to three. Ayisi is inspired by music from Tupac, Biggie Smalls, Eminem, Bob Marley, Youssou Ndour just to mention a few. Ayisi release Mixtape Mayhem under 2ligit records and Headstrong Ep.

Discography

Albums 
Mixtape Mayhem (2014)
Headstrong EP (2016)
Linkop EP (2020)
The Unbroken (2022)

Videography 
Anger Management by A.I  
Grind - Vision Dj featuring A.I 
Moving On by A.I 
Prayer by Ayisi  
Blessings by Ayisi

Awards

External Links

References 
 

1986 births
Living people
People from Accra